EWWL League for the season 2001–02 was the first season of the Adriatic League. Attended by six teams from four countries, a champion for the first time in history, became the team Merkur Celje. In this season participating clubs from Bosnia and Herzegovina, Croatia, Slovenia and from Austria. Winner Play Off this season for the team Merkur Celje from Slovenia.

Team information

Regular season
The League of the season was played with 6 teams and play a dual circuit system, each with each one game at home and away. The three best teams at the end of the regular season were placed in the Play Off.

Play Off
Play Off to be played 22 and 23 January 2002 in the Dvorana Baldekin in Šibenik, Croatia. The Play Off teams are playing against each other, and the champion was the team with the most victories achieved.

Awards
Play Off MVP: Katja Temnik of Merkur Celje

References

External links
 2001-02 EWWL league

2001–02
2001–02 in European women's basketball leagues
2001–02 in Bosnia and Herzegovina basketball
2001–02 in Slovenian basketball
2001–02 in Austrian basketball
2001–02 in Croatian basketball